Exocarpos strictus, with common names pale-fruit ballart, pale ballart, and dwarf cherry, is an adaptably versatile erect shrub bearing cherry-like fruit, that forms dense thickets, that is native to parts of Australia (including Tasmania). E. strictus was described by botanist Robert Brown in 1810.

Branches and leaves 
Though often hairy early on, E. strictus'''  branches typically become fine and vertical; occasionally they become either stout or long (rarely above 3.5 m) and bending downward with the weight of their foliage and/or fruit.

Its leaves are 1 – 3 mm in length, caducous, linear, subulate, and vary in color from light green to a bluish-green, and ashy to bronze

 Flowers 
The flowers of E. strictus grow in little pedunculate or sessile clusters numbering 2–6. They have 4 or 5, triangular, tepals that measure about 0.5 mm long. The pedicel is 2–7 mm long, succulent, broadly obovoid, and colored either mauve, red, or white.E. strictus flowers all year round.

 Fruit 
The fruit of E. strictus superficially resemble stunted cherries. They are drupes measuring 2.5 – 4 mm, are ovoid or globose, shiny, and green to purple-black in coloration.

 Distribution and occurrence E. strictus grows in great numbers in all but the very wettest and driest of habitats ranging from heathland to open forests to denser woodland.

It is common in Victoria, South Australia, Queensland, New South Wales, Tasmania and the Australian Capital Territory

 References 

 External links 
 Australian Plant Image Index has a picture of Exocarpos strictus''

strictus
Plants described in 1810
Flora of South Australia
Flora of Queensland
Flora of New South Wales
Flora of Victoria (Australia)
Taxa named by Robert Brown (botanist, born 1773)